Fireball Forward is a 1972 American TV movie. It was directed by Marvin J. Chomsky and written by Edmund H. North. It was produced by Frank McCarthy who called it "son of Patton": it follows a hard luck Army division in 1944 France, and the General who must lick it into shape. The film was a pilot for a proposed TV series.

Plot

After D-Day the Maj. General Joe Barret (Ben Gazzara), was decorated with Distinguished Service Cross medal, after that, Gen. Omar Bradley transfers him to 14th Division due to poor performance in battle.

Barret found the 14th Division with a bad combat record, lack of morale and discipline. After two disastrous battles against the German army, Barret discovers that he has a mole who turns out to be the head of the French Resistance, Jean Duval (Ricardo Montalbán), Barret learned through Sgt. Collins (Morgan Paull), that before each battle the enemy knew their strategy.

Once Barret discovered the spy, the 14th Division won the next battle and clean all the way to Gen. Patton to Berlin.  Except for the fact that U.S. Forces only went to the Elbe river. Everything East of the Elbe was left for the Russians. Only after the surrender did the Western Allied forces enter Berlin per the Potsdam Declaration.

Cast

 Ben Gazzara as Maj. Gen. Joe Barret
 Ricardo Montalban as Jean Duval
 Anne Francis as Helen Sawyer
 Dana Elcar as Col. Talbot
 Edward Binns as Corps. Commander
 Morgan Paull as Sgt. Andrew Collins
 Curt Lowens as Capt. Bauer
 L.Q. Jones as Maj. Larkin
 Eddie Albert as Col. Douglas Graham
 Richard Yniguez as Capt. Tony Sánchez

References

External links
Fireball Forward at IMDb

1972 television films
1972 films
American television films
Films directed by Marvin J. Chomsky